Diuris magnifica, commonly called the large pansy orchid is a species of orchid which is endemic to the south-west of Western Australia. It has large, colourful flowers and is common in a narrow range near the coast around Perth, often occurring with the similar but smaller Diuris corymbosa.

Description
The species is similar to several other Diuris including D. corymbosa and D. amplissima but is distinguished from them by its size, flowering period and distribution. Flowering occurs from late August to October.

Taxonomy and naming
Diuris magnifica was first formally described in 1991 by David Jones from a specimen collected in a reserve near Kwinana and the description was published in Australian Orchid Review. The specific epithet (magnifica) is a Latin word  meaning "noble", "eminent" or "splendid" referring to the large, colourful flowers of this orchid.

Distribution and habitat
The large pansy orchid is common in near coastal shrubland and woodland between Lancelin and Mandurah in the Geraldton Sandplains, Jarrah Forest and Swan Coastal Plain biogeographic regions. At the northern end of its distribution, this species hybridises with the as yet undescribed Arrowsmith pansy orchid (Diuris sp. 'Eneabba') and in the south with D. corymbosa.

Conservation
Diuris magnifica is classified as "not threatened" by the Western Australian Government Department of Parks and Wildlife.

References

magnifica
Endemic orchids of Australia
Orchids of Western Australia
Endemic flora of Western Australia
Plants described in 1991